Dhir Ali Miah (1 January 1920 – 1984) was a Bangladeshi flute player, composer, director and orchestra conductor. He was awarded Ekushey Padak in 1986 by the Government of Bangladesh.

Education and career
Miah studied in Sonarang High School. He took lessons to play flute from musician Sadeq Ali. He joined the Dhaka station of Radio Pakistan as a staff artist in 1948. He retired in 1983 as Deputy Chief Music Producer.

Miah worked as assistant music director of the first Bengali language full-length film Mukh O Mukhosh. Later he directed music of films like Nachghar, Ujala, Joyar Elo, Kavchanmala, Abar Banabase Rupbhan, Dasyurani, and Kajalrekha.

Awards
 Tamgha-e-Imtiaz (1965)
 Ekushey Padak (1984)

References

1920 births
1984 deaths
People from Munshiganj District
Bangladeshi male musicians
Recipients of the Ekushey Padak in arts
Recipients of the Pride of Performance
Date of death missing
Place of death missing
20th-century male musicians